Allan Elgar (29 June 1960 – 15 January 1999) was a South African cricketer. He played in 36 first-class and 24 List A matches from 1981/82 to 1993/94. Elgar killed himself in January 1999, aged 38.

References

External links
 

1960 births
1999 deaths
South African cricketers
Boland cricketers
Northerns cricketers
Western Province cricketers
Cricketers from Durban
1999 suicides
Suicides by firearm in South Africa